Tommy Airline (stylized as "✈Tommy airline") is the second solo album released by vocalist Tomoko Kawase under the alter-ego Tommy february6. The album heavily features 80's inspired dance themes. The album was also released as a limited edition CD and DVD package, including music videos and karaoke videos. The anime characters portraying the flight attendants on the cover are the Sanrio creation Little Twin Stars. The Little Twin Stars also appear in the video for the song "Magic in Your Eyes". The album is certified platinum by the Recording Industry Association of Japan.

Track listing

Personnel
Tommy february6 - executive producer ("Total Produced & Organized by...")
Malibu Convertible - producer, arranger, recording engineer, mixing engineer
Tomohiro Murata - additional recording & mixing engineer on tracks 3, 6, 7 & 8
Takashi Yoshiba - additional recording & mixing engineer on tracks 5 & 9
Mix assisted by Hiroya Takayama / Keizo Mogi and Naoya Tokunou

References 

2004 albums
Defstar Records albums
Tomoko Kawase albums